The following is a list of Malayalam films released in the year 1979.

Dubbed films

References

 1979
1979
Malayalam
Fil